Mitsumata may refer to:
Edgeworthia chrysantha, known as Mitsumata, a plant used in making Japanese paper
 Mitsumata Station, a rail station in Maebashi, Japan 
 16731 Mitsumata, a main belt asteroid